Tarun Gogoi constituted his ministry for a second time on 21 May 2006. Gogoi had previously been Chief Minister since 2001. Following the 2006 Assam Legislative Assembly election, Gogoi became Chief Minister for a second time as he had formed his first ministry previously. The coalition government was supported by the Hagrama faction of the Bodoland People's Progressive Front, NCP and independents. There were 17 cabinet ministers and one minister of state, all of whom were either Congress or Independent.

Gogoi was sworn on 14 May 2006 at Raj Bhavan. Earlier, Gogoi arrived with his wife Dolly Gogoi and several newly elected MLAs at Raj Bhavan. The oath of office and secrecy was administered to Gogoi by Governor Ajai Singh at a simple function in the Durbar Hall of the Raj Bhavan in Guwahati.  Digvijay Singh, who was in charge of Congress affairs in Assam, AICC observer Chandan Bagchi, BPF president Hagrama Mohilary and state Congress president Bhubaneswar Kalita attended the swearing-in ceremony. Asom Gana Parishad president Brindaban Goswami and AGP-Progressive president and former Chief Minister Prafulla Kumar Mahanta were also present. The opposition BJP and AIUDF were absent. Gogoi allotted the portfolios to his ministers on 21 May 2006.

During the ministry the law and order situation abruptly improved and the financial condition of the state improved. Gogoi gave importance to implementation of the schemes of the Central Government by different departments of the state. He also gave importance for industrialization of the state. He also took initiative to solve the insurgency problems of Assam through negotiation.

Ministers

References 

Assam ministries
Indian National Congress state ministries
Indian National Congress
Cabinets established in 2006
2006 in Indian politics